NZP may refer to:
New Zealand pound
New Zealand Police
National Zoological Park (United States)